Apollyon: The Destroyer Is Unleashed is the fifth book in the Left Behind series. It was written by Tim LaHaye and Jerry B. Jenkins in 1998. It was published on Monday, February 1, 1999, and was on The New York Times Best Seller List for 20 weeks. It takes place 27–38 months into the Tribulation.

Plot introduction
The prologue is the last two pages of Soul Harvest.

Plot summary
Cameron "Buck" Williams and Rayford Steele have become international fugitives. New believers like Condor 216 first officer Mac McCullum and computer programmer David Hassid take their places as moles in the Global Community (GC) and use his infrastructures to evangelize and thwart Carpathia's attempts to find members of the Tribulation Force. Ray and Ken Ritz go to the States to check in on Hattie Durham and the safe house. Hattie confesses to Rayford that Amanda White was entirely innocent of supposed collaboration with Carpathia - the e-mail texts were simply an elaborate smear campaign ordered by Carpathia himself.

At the prophesied conference of witnesses, held at Teddy Kollek Stadium and hosted by Tsion Ben-Judah, the Potentate makes an unwelcome visit. At this time, Israel's water turns to blood, which Carpathia blames on the Two Witnesses. Jacov, Chaim Rosenzweig's driver, becomes a believer; later that night he is found in a bar, telling people that Jesus is Messiah. The next day at the conference, Tsion tells the audience they are waiting for the next Trumpet Judgment, in which the sun, moon, and stars will darken by 1/3. He also explains that 3/4 of the population since the Rapture will die prior to the end of the Tribulation. The last night of the conference, the Two Witnesses appear at the stadium. Then a GC attack breaks out while the Trib. Force retreats to Chaim's estate which, being an old embassy, has a helipad. Ken flies to the house in GC1, Nicolae's helicopter, and gets the force into the chopper. While transferring the force at the airport, Ken Ritz is shot trying to give Rayford as much time as he needs.

Hattie, now desperate to live only for the life of her child, is raced to a hospital, where they meet another believer named Leah Rose. She and Tribulation Force physician Floyd Charles try to deliver the baby, but after some work, the baby is stillborn. According to Floyd, Hattie had been poisoned by Carpathia, resulting in the death of her child.

Buck is still in Israel after a failed attempt to get him on the plane, returning to Chaim's estate. A few days later, the fourth Trumpet Judgement strikes, and the world gets considerably colder, delaying Buck's return to the States. During the GC news report, Chaim, though still a skeptic, tells about the truth of the judgments, endorses Tsion's lesson and tells the world about his website.

Rayford goes to Palwaukee Airport after the judgment lifts to sort out Ken Ritz's affairs. He must deal with the not-very-smart Bo Hanson and his friend Ernie, who it turns out has faked the mark of the believer to gain access to Ken's stash of money, which is very large. As they argue, the fifth Trumpet Judgment falls and a horde of demonic locusts swarm the earth, attacking everyone who does not bear the mark of the believer, in which it is so horrible that men try to kill themselves but are not allowed to die. Rayford meets T.M. Delanty, who is almost the full owner of Palwaukee and a believer. As the months pass and the locusts continue to attack, Chloe's pregnancy comes to an end. Buck is still in Jerusalem trying to get Chaim to accept Jesus, but returns home in time for the birth of his child. Chloe Steele Williams goes into labour, and after a scare delivers a healthy baby boy in the most chaotic period in human history. She names him Kenneth Bruce Williams in memory of Ken Ritz and the late Bruce Barnes.

Characters
Rayford Steele
Cameron "Buck" Williams
Chloe Steele Williams
Kenneth Bruce Williams, Buck and Chloe's Son
Ken Ritz, dies in this book
Rabbi Tsion Ben-Judah
David Hassid
Mac McCullum
Supreme Potentate Nicolae Carpathia
Jacov, Chaim's driver
Supreme Commander Leon Fortunato
Dr. Chaim Rosenzweig
Hattie Durham
Nurse Leah Rose
Dr. Floyd Charles
Tyrola Mark Delanty, owner of Palwaukee Airport
Abdullah Smith

Product placement
The King David Hotel, has been taken over by GC leaders.
Ken still is using a Gulfstream Jet.
The Land Rover Range Rover is now cleaned up and still being driven by Buck.
The Trib. Force used a Mercedes van when they went to the stadium during the conference.
T's vehicle is a red Jeep

References

Left Behind series
1999 American novels
American post-apocalyptic novels
Novels set in Chicago
Novels set in Iraq
Novels set in Jerusalem